Moosehead Pond Outlet flows into the South Branch Grass River near Newbridge, New York.

References 

Rivers of New York (state)